Alexander Konychev (born 25 July 1998 in Verona) is an Italian cyclist, who currently rides for UCI ProTeam .

He is the son of former professional cyclist Dimitri Konyshev, and was born in Italy while his father was competing for the  team.

Major results
2016
 2nd Overall Giro di Basilicata
2018
 5th Road race, National Under–23 Road Championships
 8th Gran Premio della Liberazione
2019
 1st L'Étoile d'Or
 4th Coppa Bernocchi
 5th Road race, National Under–23 Road Championships
 6th Grand Prix d'Isbergues
2021
 5th Road race, National Road Championships

References

External links

1998 births
Living people
Italian male cyclists
Sportspeople from Verona
Italian people of Russian descent
Cyclists from the Province of Verona